This is a list of University of New England (Australia) people, including a number of notable alumni and faculty members of the University of New England.

Alumni

Academics
 Don Aitkin, professor of politics at Macquarie University (1971–79) and the Australian National University (1980-1988);  Vice-Chancellor of the University of Canberra (1991-2002)
 Kym Anderson,  Professor of Economics at the University of Adelaide and the Australian National University; President of the Policy Advisory Council at the Australian Centre for International Agricultural Research
 Max Hartwell (1921-2009), professor of economic history at the University of New South Wales (1950–56); reader in economic and social history at the University of Oxford;  professorial fellow of Nuffield College Oxford (1956–77) (Emeritus 1977); was amongst the first intake of students in 1938 at the New England University College and the first of his cohort to become a professor
 Keith Leopold (1920-1999), professor of German at the University of Queensland (1964); was amongst the first intake of students in 1938 at the New England University College
 John Quiggin, Australian Research Council Federation Fellow in economics and political science
 Brenda Walker, Award-winning novelist and Winthrop Professor of English and Cultural Studies at the University of Western Australia. Sister of Don Walker

Business
 Douglas Daft, AC, former global CEO of Coca-Cola
 Canning Fok Kin-ning, group managing director of Hutchison Whampoa and Chairman of Hongkong Electric Holdings

Government

Politicians
 Natalie Bennett, the Rt Honourable Baroness Bennett, leader of the Green Party of England and Wales
 Dean Brown, AO, former Premier of South Australia
 David Elliott, the current Member of the New South Wales Legislative Assembly
 Barnaby Joyce, former Deputy Prime Minister of Australia and current Member of the Australian Parliament for New England
 John Kerin, AO, former Member of the Australian Parliament and Federal minister (Primary Industries, Energy, Transport and Communication, Trade and Overseas Development, Treasurer)
 Don Page, former Member of the New South Wales Legislative Assembly and grandson of Sir Earle Page, founding Chancellor of UNE
 Milena Pires, member of the first National Parliament of East Timor and Permanent Representative to the United Nations
 George Souris, AM, former member of the New South Wales Legislative Assembly 
 Tony Windsor, former Member of the Australian Parliament for New England

Civil servants
 Jock R. Anderson, professor and agricultural economist at the World Bank
Justin Brown, Australian diplomat who has served as High Commissioner to Canada (2008-2011) and Ambassador to Belgium, Luxembourg, the European Union and NATO (2018- )
 Bernie Fraser, former governor of the Reserve Bank of Australia

Humanities

Arts
 Amanda Bishop, comedian, actor and musician
 Lewis Fitz-Gerald, actor, writer and director
 Lionel Gilbert, historian
 Don Walker, musician, notably with Cold Chisel. Brother of Brenda Walker.

Literature, writing and poetry
 Marshall Moore, American writer
 James Page, educationist
 Gayla Reid, writer
 James Wilson-Miller, Indigenous writer

Law
Geoffrey Edelsten, businessman and entrepreneur

Sciences
Catherine King – ecotoxicologist, Antarctic researcher
 Dame Bridget Ogilvie, AC DBE, medical scientist

Sport
 Suzy Balogh, OAM 2004 Olympic gold medal shooter
 Katherine Calder, 2010 Winter Olympics cross-country skier
 Roy Masters, sports journalist and former rugby league football coach
 Kathleen Partridge, 1988 Olympic gold medal field hockey; 1992 Olympics (goalkeeper)
 Damian Smith, member of the Australia national rugby union team, Wallaby #707
 Amelia White, 2020 Tokyo Paralympics Para-equestrian

Administration

Chancellors

Vice-Chancellors

Sir Robert Madgwick, OBE, (1954–1966)
Sir Zelman Cowen, AK, GCVO, GCMG, PC, QC (1966–1970)
Alec Lazenby, AO, (1970–1977)
Ronald Gates, AO (1977–1985)
Lawrence W Nicol (1985–1988)
Don McNicol (1988–1990)
Robert HT Smith, AM, (1990–1994)
Bruce Thom, AM, (1994–1996)
Ingrid Moses, AO, (1997–2006)
 Alan Pettigrew (2006–2010)
James Barber (2010-2014)
Annabelle Duncan (2014-2019)
Brigid Heywood (2019-2022)

Faculty

References

New England, University of
University of New England (Australia)
University